Dafina Gexha-Bunjaku is a Kosovar Albanian epidemiologist and current deputy minister of health of the Republic of Kosovo. After a successful career with the Kosovo Institute of Public Health, she joined the second Kurti government as deputy minister in March 2021. She acted as minister from 1 October to 16 November 2021.

Education 
Gexha-Bunjaku received her MD degree from the University of Prishtina in 2004, after a hiatus during the Kosovo War and its aftermath. In 2011, she completed her residency with the National Institute of Public Health and obtained an MBA in health management from a joint program of the University of Prishtina and the University of Vienna.

Career
From 2000 to 2013, Gexha-Bunjaku worked with the World Health Organization office in Prishtina, HLSP Institute, and other health-related programs and consultancies assisting the Ministry of Health. In January 2008, she joined the National Institute for Public Health as an epidemiologist – a position she held for over 13 years, until her current government position.

During the early stages of the COVID-19 pandemic in Kosovo, while part of the national public health institute, Gexha-Bunjaku helped draft prevention and control measures that received international praise. She also served as the Kosovo coordinator for the European Center for Disease Prevention and Control and co-designed the family medicine program supported by WHO and the UK Royal College of General Practitioners.

Gexha-Bunjaku's research on HIV and communicable diseases has been published internationally.

References

Living people
Kosovo Albanians
Women epidemiologists
Government ministers of Kosovo
Year of birth missing (living people)